Pileh Jin (also Romanized as Pīleh Jīn; also known as Pelī Jīn, Pelījīn, Pīlajīn, and Pīlī Jīn) is a village in Sardrud-e Sofla Rural District, Sardrud District, Razan County, Hamadan Province, Iran. At the 2006 census, its population was 397, in 92 families.

References 

Populated places in Razan County